The 2015–16 Iraq FA Cup was the 27th edition of the Iraqi knockout football cup as a clubs-only competition, the main domestic cup in Iraqi football. It was the second edition held after the 2002–03 edition, although the 2012–13 one was abandoned.

At first, thirty-nine teams were set to participate in the competition, but after the withdrawals of many of the Iraqi Premier League teams, only days before the second round, clubs including Al-Shorta, Al-Talaba, Al-Hudood, Al-Sinaa, Naft Maysan, Al-Najaf, Zakho, and Al-Kahrabaa, a total of twelve teams from the Iraqi Premier League and nineteen from Iraq Division One ended up participating. It began on 5 October 2015 and ended on 29 May 2016 with the final at the Al-Shaab Stadium in Baghdad.

The winner of the competition was Al-Quwa Al-Jawiya who won their fourth cup by defeating record winners Al-Zawraa 2–0 in the final. Therefore, they qualified for the 2017 AFC Cup.

Format

Participation 
The cup starts with a qualifying round of the 19 teams from the Iraq Division One, 14 of which play against each other and 5 of which automatically proceed to the next round. The 20 (later becoming 12) teams from the Iraqi Premier League join the other teams in the Round of 32.

Draw 
For the first round, the participating teams will be split into two pots of 9 teams in one and 10 in the other. For the remaining rounds other than the final, the draw will be conducted from just one pot. The final is held in the Al-Shaab Stadium, a nominally neutral venue.

Match rules 
Teams meet in one game in the first round, round of 32 and round of 16. In the quarterfinals and semifinals, the teams will have two-legged ties. The final will have only one-leg. A match will take place for 90 minutes, with two halves of 45 minutes. If still tied after regulation or tied on aggregate, the match will be decided by a penalty shootout. A coin toss will decide who takes the first penalty.

Cards 
If a player receives a second yellow card, they will be banned from the next cup match. If a player receives a red card, they will be banned a minimum of one match, but more can be added by the Iraq Football Association.

Participating clubs 
The following 31 teams participated in the competition:

Bold: indicated teams are still in competition
Al-Shorta, Al-Talaba, Al-Hudood, Al-Sinaa, Naft Maysan, Al-Najaf, Zakho, and Al-Kahrabaa withdrew from the competition on 10 November 2015.

Map

Schedule 
The rounds of the 2015–16 competition are scheduled as follows:

First round 
The first round was drawn on 1 September 2015 at 12:00 in the Iraq Football Association building in Baghdad by the Director of the Competitions Committee Shihab Ahmed. The matches took place from 5–6 October 2015.

Diyala, Al-Sulaikh, Al-Saha, Balad, and Al-Kufa gained automatic qualification to the Second Round.

Second round 
The Second Round and the Round of 16 were drawn on 4 November 2015 at 12:00 in the Iraq Football Association building in Baghdad by the Director of the Competitions Committee Shihab Ahmed. The matches took place from 10–12 November 2015.

Al-Khutoot, Naft Al-Junoob, Naft Al-Wasat, Al-Saha, Al-Quwa Al-Jawiya, Al-Jaish, Balad, and Duhok gained automatic qualification to the Round of 16 after the withdrawals of their respective opponents: Al-Shorta, Al-Talaba, Al-Hudood, Al-Sinaa, Naft Maysan, Al-Najaf, Zakho, and Al-Kahrabaa in the Second Round.

Round of 16 
Round of 16 matches took place from 16–17 November 2015.

Quarter-finals 
The draw for the quarterfinals was held on 15 December 2015 at 12:00 in the Iraq Football Association building in Baghdad by the Director of the Competitions Committee Shihab Ahmed. The matches took place from 19–27 December 2015.

First legs

Second legs 

Duhok won 3–2 on aggregate.

Naft Al-Junoob won 6–3 on aggregate.

Al-Zawraa won 4–3 on aggregate.

Al-Quwa Al-Jawiya won 2–1 on aggregate.

Semi-finals

First legs

Second legs 

Al-Zawraa won 4–1 on aggregate.

4–4 on aggregate. Al-Quwa Al-Jawiya won on away goals.

Final

Bracket 
From the Round of 16 onwards:

Broadcasting rights 
The broadcasting rights were bought by Ishtar Cinema Production Co. Ltd from the Iraq Football Association for five seasons in the start of the 2015–16 season. Al-Iraqiya Sport signed a protocol with the company to televise the FA Cup and the Iraqi Premier League matches. From the first round until the second legs of the semifinals, no channel was interested in buying the FA Cup matches' rights. On 10 January 2016, Al-Iraqiya Sport bought the rights of the last three games of the competition. However, the administrative board of Al-Quwa Al-Jawiya refused to televise their match against Duhok on live TV. On 4 April, the director of the production company, Mohammed Haijal, announced that the broadcasting rights of the final were given to Al-Kass Sports Channel.

References

External links
 Iraq Football Association

Iraq FA Cup
Cup
Iraq FA Cup